Thirumalapuram is a Village Panchayat in Chityal mandal of Hanamkonda district, Telangana state, India.
Thirumalapuram is also called Thirumalapur. The ancient name for Thirumalapur is Bokkalapadu.

Agriculture 
Agriculture is the only occupation for villagers. Due to lack of irrigation facilities, most of the farmers depend on rain water. River - Bokkalapadu-pedda-cheruvu, reserves the rain water.

Cash Crops: Cotton, Red Chilli, etc.
Food Crops: Rice, Corn, Groundnut, Sunflower, Turmeric etc.

Education 
There is one government primary school for children up to 5th standard.
Children from this village travel to Chityal or Jookal for higher education every day.
Many people who have born in Thirumalapuram settled abroad..

Transportation 
There is a RTC bus facility to this village from Parkal and Hanamkonda/Warangal. Buses towards Chityal, Vekatraopalli, Giddemutharam, Tekumatla, Andukuthanda, etc. will go via thirumalapuram.  Privately operated vehicles like Jeeps and vans also play important role in people transportation.

Villages in Hanamkonda district